Mohamed Coumbassa (born 15 March 1995) is a Guinean footballer who plays for Guinean side Horoya AC  as a midfielder.

References

External links

Mohamed Coumbassa at Footballdatabase

1995 births
Living people
Association football midfielders
Guinean footballers
USM El Harrach players
Horoya AC players
Guinea A' international footballers
Expatriate footballers in Egypt
Expatriate footballers in Algeria
NA Hussein Dey players
Al Nasr SC (Egypt) players
Santoba FC players
Guinean expatriate sportspeople in Egypt
Guinean expatriate sportspeople in Algeria
Guinean expatriate footballers
2020 African Nations Championship players